Anthrenus festivus is a species of carpet beetle in the family Dermestidae. It is found in western Europe.

References 

Anthrenus
Beetles described in 1846